The First Division is the second-tier association football league in Namibia. It operates under the auspices of the Namibia Football Association.

Organization 
The First Division is divided into the Northern Stream (NSFD) and the Southern Stream (SSFD), each consisting of 13 teams from their respective regions. For some seasons the Northern Stream has been divided into separate North East and North West streams.

The Northern Stream includes clubs from the Caprivi, Kavango, Oshana, Omusati, Kunene, Otjozondjupa, Ohangwena, and Oshikoto regions.

The Southern Stream includes clubs located in Khomas, Omaheke, Erongo, Hardap, and Karas regions.

Promotion and relegation 
The winners of both the Northern and Southern Streams are promoted to the Namibia Premier Football League. The three lowest placed teams from each stream are relegated to the Regional Second Division.

History 
The league began operating under the now-defunct Namibia Premier League for the 2006/07 season. In 2021 the league returned from a hiatus of over three years caused by troubles at the NFA and the COVID-19 pandemic. For this special transitional tournament, the league was divided into four streams: Southern, Coastal, Inland, and Central.

Champions 
2006/07: Windhoek Hotspurs FC (Northern), Fedics United (Southern)
2007/08: Chief Santos FC (Northern), Windhoek Hotspurs FC (Southern)
2008/09: United Stars FC (Northern), Blue Waters F.C. (Southern)
2009/10: Mighty Gunners F.C. (Northern), Blue Boys FC (Southern)
2010/11: United Stars FC (Northern), Monitronics Success College FC (Southern)
2011/12: Unknown
2012/13: United Stars FC (Northern), Blue Boys FC (Southern)
2013/14: Benfica (North West), Touch & Go FC (North East), Citizens FC (Southern)
2014/15: Young Chiefs FC (North West), Rundu Chiefs FC (North East), Flamingoes FC (Southern)
2015/16: Young African (Southern)
2016/17: Unknown
2017/18: Julinho Sporting F.C. (North East), Military School Okahandja FC (North West), Young Brazilians FC (Southern)
2018/19: Not held
2019/20: Cancelled
2021:

References 

Football in Namibia
South